Irina Armstrong née Loginova (born 6 December 1970) is a Russian-born German female professional darts player who currently plays in the World Darts Federation (WDF) events. Her biggest achievement to date was advanced to semi-finals in the 2011 BDO World Darts Championship. She is a gold medalist in pairs competitions during the WDF World Cup and WDF Europe Cup.

Career
Armstrong started out playing ten-pin bowling until she was pregnant and decided to pick up darts. From then, she has quickly risen to be one of the top women players in the world. She picked up wins in the singles and pairs events in the Belgium Open and Finland Open, and followed it up with a win in the German Open pairs with Carina Ekberg of Sweden. Armstrong's greatest achievement to date came at the 2007 WDF World Cup in Rosmalen, Netherlands, where she won the women' pairs title with Anastasia Dobromyslova.

Armstrong's performances in 2008 included wins in the French Open, Dortmund Open, German Gold Cup, Open Holland, and the Primus Masters. She was also the runner-up of the England Open, Swiss Open, and the Danish Open, and moved to as high as third in the world rankings.

Despite her successes during 2008, Armstrong was surprisingly overlooked for a place in the Zuiderduin Masters, a BDO major held in the Netherlands. Having missed out initially on an automatic place for the tournament by just one place, a spot was made available after Anastasia Dobromyslova was forced to withdraw from the competition, but it was given to Lisa Ashton instead, who would go on to win the tournament. Still hoping for a wild card, the card was handed to German player Monique Lessmeister, who at the time was ranked 66 places below Armstrong in the world rankings.

Armstrong continued her good form into 2009 and secured qualification for the Lakeside World Championship by winning the England Open.  She also made up for last year's disappointment by ensuring qualification for the Zuiderduin.

International appearances
Armstrong started her international career with her native Russia where she won a gold medal in the Ladies Pairs with Anastasia Dobromyslova. Armstrong always felt though that it was not right playing for Russia as she never played in any Russian ranking events in order to qualify for the team.
Having lived in Germany for many years, and with the German organisation asking her on several occasions, Armstrong took time out from international appearances in order to be eligible for the German team.
In 2013, she made her debut at the WDF World Cup singles for Germany in Canada where she finished runner up to England's Deta Hedman. This was not her debut for Germany though she had previously played in the Lorna Croft Friendship Cup, helping Germany to win it for the first time in its history. She also played for Germany in the WDF Europe Cup.

Personal life

Armstrong is married to Englishman John Armstrong, with two children, son Christian and daughter Ksenia. She currently resides in Gangelt, Germany and previously lived in the Netherlands. She is fluent in German and English.

Her main hobby outside of darts is making jewellery, which, whilst it started as a hobby, has now become a quickly grown business.

World Championship results

BDO
 2010: Quarter-finals (lost to Deta Hedman 0–2) (sets)
 2011: Semi-finals (lost to Trina Gulliver 0–2)
 2013: Quarter-finals (lost to Sharon Prins 1–2)
 2014: Quarter-finals (lost to Deta Hedman 0–2)
 2015: First round (lost to Anastasia Dobromyslova 0–2)

PDC
 2010: First round (lost to Deta Hedman 0–4) (legs)

Performance timeline

References

External links
 Official Website

Living people
1970 births
German darts players
Russian darts players
Professional Darts Corporation women's players